Golam Moula (1920-1967) was a Pakistani medical doctor, politician and political organizer. He was elected a member of the East Pakistan Legislative Assembly in the by-elections of 1956 and a member of the National Assembly of Pakistan in 1962. At that time he was the whip of the opposition in the Pakistan National Assembly.

Early life 
Moula was born on 20 October 1920 in Poragachha, Naria police station, Shariatpur District. His father's name was Alhaj Abdul Gafur Dhali and his mother's name was Chhutu Bibi. He started his education at Pachukhar Kandi Primary School in Jajira Upazila. He matriculated from Naria Bihari Lal High School in 1939, passed ISC from Jagannath College, Dhaka in 1941 and BSc in 1943.

He passed the first phase of MSc in Geology from University of Calcutta and MSc from Dhaka University. Later in 1948 he was admitted to Calcutta Medical College for MBBS course. After partition, he enrolled in the second year MBBS course at Dhaka Medical College and obtained the MBBS degree there in 1954.

Career 
Mowla was the commander of the Mukul Fauj in Calcutta while studying. In 1952 he was the Vice-President of the Student Parliament of Dhaka Medical College and the Vice-President of the East Pakistan Chhatra League.

Mowla played a strong role in the 1952 Bengali Language movement. He was a member of the All-Party Rashtrabhasha Sangram Parishad formed on 31 January of that year at the Dhaka Bar Library under the chairmanship of Maulana Abdul Hamid Khan Bhasani. At that time he was the convener of the Rashtrabhasha Sangram Parishad of Dhaka Medical College. Golam Mawla played a special role in the decision to observe Rashtrabhasha Day through hartal on 21 February and Flag Day on 21 and 23 February at the meeting of the All-Party Rashtrabhasha Sangram Parishad held at the office of Mughaltulistha East Bengal on 150 February 1952.

From 20 February 1952, the government issued section 144 for one month and banned rallies and processions. Immediately after this announcement, the medical students, led by Golam Mawla, came together and immediately decided to break section 144 and continue the movement. After the shooting of the student procession on 21 February, most of the leaders of the movement met at the Engineering College, Dhaka at night to decide the strategy of the movement. When the Student Struggle Committee was newly formed at this meeting, Mowla was elected the convener of the committee.

The first Shaheed Minar was built on the night of 23 February under the overall supervision of Mowla at the site of the first shooting at the Medical College Hostel premises.

At the end of his student life, Mowla engaged in the medical profession in Madaripur. At this time he joined the Awami Muslim League. He was the president of Madaripur subdivision unit of Awami League. He was elected a member of the East Pakistan Legislative Assembly in the by-elections of 1956 and a member of the National Assembly of Pakistan in 1962. He was the opposition whip in the Pakistan National Assembly.

Death and legacy 
Mowla died on 29 May 1967. The bridge over the Naria Kirtinasha river has been renamed Dr. Golam Mowla Bridge in memory of Mowla and Dhanmondi Road No. 1 in Dhaka was renamed Dr. Golam Mowla Road.

In 2010, he was awarded the Ekushey Padak for his contribution to the Bengali Language movement.

References

Rajshahi College alumni
Pakistani medical doctors
Recipients of the Ekushey Padak
1920 births
1967 deaths
University of Dhaka alumni
Dhaka Medical College alumni
University of Calcutta alumni
Medical College and Hospital, Kolkata alumni
Pakistani MNAs 1962–1965
People from Naria Upazila